David-Augustin de Brueys (18 September 164125 November 1723) was a French theologian and playwright. He was born in Aix-en-Provence. His family was Calvinist, and he studied theology. After writing a critique of Jacques-Bénigne Bossuet's work, he was in turn converted to Catholicism by Bossuet in 1681, and later became a priest.

After his conversion, he was actively engaged in propagating the faith. He also managed to be joint editor with Palaprat in the production of plays. He died in Montpellier.

Publications 
1682:  Réponse au livre de Mr de Condom, intitulé « Exposition de la doctrine de l'Église catholique sur les matières de controverse »
1683: Examen des raisons qui ont donné lieu à la séparation des Protestans
1686: Défense du culte extérieur de l'Eglise catholique, avec la réfutation des deux réponses faites à l'examen des raisons qui ont donné lieu à la séparation des Protestants et aux nouveaux convertis 
1686: Réponse aux plaintes des Protestans contre les moyens que l'on employe en France pour les réunir à l'Église, où l'on réfute les calomnies qui sont contenuës dans le livre intitulé « La Politique du clergé de France », et dans les autres libelles de cette nature
1686: Traité de l'Eucharistie, en forme d'entretiens 
1687: Traité de l'Église, en forme d'entretiens, ce qui sert de réfutation aux derniers livres de Messieurs Claude et Jurieu 
1690: Action de grâces pour remercier Dieu des prospéritez de la France 
1692: Histoire du fanatisme de nostre temps, et le dessein que l'on avoit de soulever en France les mécontens des calvinistes
1700: Traité de la sainte messe
1709: Traité de l'obéissance des chrétiens aux puissances temporelles 
1727: Traité du légitime usage de la raison, principalement sur les objets de la foy Read online
Theatre
1691: Le Grondeur, comedy in 3 acts and in prose, Paris, Comédie-Française, 3 February
1691: Le Muet, comedy in 5 acts and in prose, Paris, Théâtre-Français, 22 June 
1692: La Fille de bon sens, comedy in three acts, with Jean de Palaprat, Paris, Hôtel de Bourgogne, 2 November
1694: L'Important de cour, comedy, with Jean de Palaprat 
1698: Les Empiriques, comedy in 3 acts 
1699: Gabinie, Christian tragedy 
1706: L'Avocat Patelin, comedy in 3 acts, with Jean de Palaprat, Paris, Comédiens français ordinaires du Roi, 4 June
1721: La Force du sang, ou le Sot toujours sot, comedy in three acts, Paris, Théâtres Français et Italien, 21 April
1725: L'Opiniâtre, comedy in three acts
Collected works
1712: Œuvres choisies de Brueys et de Palaprat, preface by Louis-Simon Auger (2 volumes) Read online 1 2

References

External links 
 His plays on CÉSAR

1640 births
1723 deaths
People from Aix-en-Provence
17th-century French Catholic theologians
17th-century French dramatists and playwrights
17th-century French male writers
18th-century French dramatists and playwrights
Converts to Roman Catholicism from Calvinism